This is a list of series released by or aired on TVB Jade Channel in 1999.

First line series
These dramas aired in Hong Kong from 7:30 to 8:30 pm, Monday to Friday on TVB.

Second line series
These dramas aired in Hong Kong from 9:35 to 10:35 pm, Monday to Friday on TVB.

Third line series
These dramas aired in Hong Kong from 10:35 to 11:05 pm, Monday to Friday on TVB.

Other series

External links
TVB.com Official Website 

TVB dramas
1999 in Hong Kong television